50S ribosomal protein L25 is a protein that in Escherichia coli is encoded by the  gene.

Function 
This ribosomal protein is a component of the 50S subunit. The protein binds 5S rRNA to form a stable complex. In turn 5S rRNA binds specifically to three proteins, L25, L18 and L5, forming a separate domain of the bacterial ribosome. Protein L25 of E. coli is not essential for survival of the cells.

Interactions 
Ribosomal protein L25 has been shown to interact with:
 50S ribosomal protein L16
 5S ribosomal RNA

References 

Proteins